Khar Bajaur Tehsil is a subdivision located in Bajaur District, Khyber Pakhtunkhwa, Pakistan. It starts in Jar to Zorbandar (east–west) and Tangai to Inzari (northwest–southwest) and A Inayat kali to Mandalu (northeast–southeast).

Main cities of tehsil Khar are, Khar bazar, Inayat kali bazar, Sadiq abad Patak bazar, Loi sum bazar and Tangai Bazar.

Geography

Adjacent administrative units
Salarzai Subdivision (North-East)
Samar Bagh Tehsil, Lower Dir District (North-East)
Utmankhel Subdivision (East)
Barang Subdivision (South-East)
Ambar Utman Khel Subdivision, Mohmand District (south)
Pindiali Subdivision, Mohmand District (southwest)
Nawagai Subdivision (northwest)
Mamund Subdivision (northwest)

History

Khar Bajaur Subdivision was part of the former Federally Administered Tribal Areas until the region was merged with Khyber Pakhtunkhwa on May 31, 2018.

Demographics

Khar Bajaur subdivision has a population of 247,510 people and 27,044 households according to the 2017 census.

See also 
 Khaar
 List of tehsils of Khyber Pakhtunkhwa

References 

Tehsils of Khyber Pakhtunkhwa
Populated places in Bajaur District